Guram I. Mchedlidze (Georgian: გურამ ი. მჭედლიძე) (September 27, 1931, Tbilisi – 2009, Tbilisi) was a Georgian Palaeobiologist, Corresponding Member of the Georgian National Academy of Sciences (GNAS), Doctor of Biological Sciences (Dr. Habil.), Professor.

Education and career
In 1954 he graduated from the Faculty of Biology of the Tbilisi State University (TSU). Since 1973 he was Professor of this Faculty.

In 1962 Mchedlidze received a PhD degree in Biology, in 1973 a degree of the Doctor of Biological Sciences. In 1983 he was elected as Corresponding Member of the Georgian National Academy of Sciences (GNAS).

In 1979-1989 he was a Deputy Director of the L. Davitashvili Institute of Palaeobiology, in 1989-2009 a Director of this Institute.

In 1971 he was elected as a Fellow of the American Society of Paleontology.

Main fields of scientific activity of Guram Mchedlidze were: a fossil dolphin, Tertiary cetaceans, phylogenesis of cetaceans, ancient mammals, etc. He was author of more than 100 scientific-research works (among them 5 monographs).

Mchedlidze was organizer and participant of many important scientific events in Georgia and abroad.

Some of main scientific works of Guram Mchedlidze
 "Fossil Cetacea of the Caucasus" (a monograph), Publishing House "Metsniereba", Tbilisi, 1964, 145 pp. (in Russian, Georgian and English summaries)
 "Some general features of the historic development of cetaceans" (a monograph), Publishing House "Metsniereba", 1970, 112 pp. (in Russian, Georgian and English summaries)
 "General features of the brain evolution of some groups of ancient mammals" (a monograph), Publishing House "Metsniereba", Tbilisi, 1986, 130 pp. (in Russian. Co-author: L.K. Gabunia)

See also
 List of Georgians

1931 births
2009 deaths
Scientists from Georgia (country)
Academic staff of Tbilisi State University
Soviet paleontologists
Soviet biologists